Kyaw Shein (born 8 March 1938) is a Burmese former sports shooter. He competed in the 50 metre rifle, prone event at the 1964 Summer Olympics. He also competed at the 1962, 1966 and 1970 Asian Games.

References

External links
 

1938 births
Living people
Burmese male sport shooters
Olympic shooters of Myanmar
Shooters at the 1964 Summer Olympics
Place of birth missing (living people)
Asian Games medalists in shooting
Shooters at the 1962 Asian Games
Shooters at the 1966 Asian Games
Shooters at the 1970 Asian Games
Asian Games bronze medalists for Myanmar
Medalists at the 1966 Asian Games
Medalists at the 1970 Asian Games